Pinkham's Grant is a township in Coös County, New Hampshire, United States. The grant lies entirely within the White Mountain National Forest. As of the 2020 United States census, the population of the grant was zero.

In New Hampshire, locations, grants, townships (which are different from towns), and purchases are unincorporated portions of a county which are not part of any town and have limited self-government (if any, as many are uninhabited).

Geography 
The grant occupies the center of Pinkham Notch, a major pass in the White Mountains. New Hampshire Route 16 passes through the grant as it traverses the notch; the highway leads north to Gorham and south to North Conway. The Appalachian Trail crosses the grant through Pinkham Notch.

The north side of the grant drains via the Peabody River to the Androscoggin River in Gorham, while the south side is drained by the Ellis River, which runs to the Saco River in Glen.

Demographics 

As of the 2020 census, there were no people living in the grant.

Recreation  
The Appalachian Mountain Club's Pinkham Notch Visitor Center in the center of the grant is a popular starting point for hikes up Mount Washington to the west and up Wildcat Mountain to the east. The base of Wildcat Mountain Ski Area is in the eastern part of the grant. A short stretch of the Mount Washington Auto Road, which begins at Glen House in neighboring Green's Grant, passes through the northwest corner of Pinkham's Grant.

References

Townships in Coös County, New Hampshire
Berlin, New Hampshire micropolitan area
Townships in New Hampshire